Starting its second season, the 2008 Red Bull MotoGP Rookies Cup season continued the search for future World Champions. The 2008 season begins with two races during the Spanish Grand Prix weekend at Jerez on March 29 and March 30 and ends with another double header at the Czech Republic Grand Prix in Brno on August 16 and August 17. Another six European GPs see single Rookies races on each Saturday, making it a ten-race championship, which is two more races than the last season.

The end of the season ended with two international team events that matched ten of the best riders from the Red Bull MotoGP Rookies Cup with ten of the best from the first and only year of the Red Bull AMA U.S. Rookies Cup. So twenty of the world's best teenagers will compete to see which side of the Atlantic can claim the Red Bull Riders Cup over two races, the first being held on September 13 at Indianapolis alongside the Grand Prix. The rematch will be on October 25 at the final Grand Prix of the season in Valencia.

The commercial rights of the championship are held by the rights-holders for the MotoGP World Championships, Dorna Sports.

The American dirt tracker J.D. Beach was proclaimed champion in the last race, in only his second season of road racing.

Calendar

Entry List
Notes
All Entrants were riding a KTM
Tyres were supplied by Dunlop 

† Guest Riders

Season standings

Scoring system
Points are awarded to the top fifteen finishers. Rider has to finish the race to earn points.
 

 Each rider's lowest score discounted.

Riders' standings

External links
 Official Site
 Season at FIM-Website

References

Red Bull MotoGP Rookies Cup
Red Bull MotoGP Rookies Cup racing seasons